Bob Sharpe (born 17 June 1951) is a Canadian basketball player. He competed in the men's tournament at the 1976 Summer Olympics.

References

External links
 

1951 births
Living people
Basketball people from Ontario
Basketball players at the 1976 Summer Olympics
Canadian men's basketball players
1974 FIBA World Championship players
Olympic basketball players of Canada
Sportspeople from Guelph
University of Guelph alumni